Bongaigaon Assembly constituency is one of the 126 constituencies of the Assam Legislative Assembly in India. Bongaigaon forms a part of the Barpeta Lok Sabha constituency.

Town Details

Following are details on Bongaigaon Assembly constituency-

Country: India.
 State: Assam.
 District: Bongaigaon district .
 Lok Sabha Constituency:  Barpeta Lok Sabha/Parliamentary.
 Assembly Categorisation: Semi Urban constituency.
 Literacy Level: 70.44%.
 Eligible Electors as per 2021 General Elections: 1,59,836 Eligible Electors. Male Electors: 81,690 . Female Electors: 78,146.
 Geographic Co-Ordinates:  26°29'18.6"N 90°32'58.9"E.
 Total Area Covered: 468 square kilometres.
 Area Includes: Bongaigaon (Part) thana in Kokrajhar sub-division; and Bongaigaon (Part) thana in Goalpara sub-division, of Bongaigaon district of Assam.
 Inter State Border :Bongaigaon.
 Number Of Polling Stations: Year 2011-218,Year 2016-222,Year 2021-32.

Members of Legislative Assembly 

Following is the list of past members representing Bongaigaon Assembly constituency in Assam Legislature.

 1967: M. M. Sinha, Indian National Congress.
 1972: Dhruba Barua, Indian National Congress.
 1978: Mathura Mohan Sinha, Janata Party.
 1983: Phani Bhusan Choudhury, Independent.
 1985: Phani Bhusan Choudhury, Independent.
 1991: Phani Bhusan Choudhury, Asom Gana Parishad.
 1996: Phani Bhusan Choudhury, Asom Gana Parishad.
 2001: Phani Bhusan Choudhury, Asom Gana Parishad.
 2006: Phani Bhusan Choudhury, Asom Gana Parishad.
 2011: Phani Bhusan Choudhury, Asom Gana Parishad.
 2016: Phani Bhusan Choudhury, Asom Gana Parishad.

Election results

2016 result

External links

References 

Assembly constituencies of Assam